USS Alacrity (SP-206) was a steel cruising yacht that served in the US Navy as a section patrol craft. It was built by Pusey & Jones at  Wilmington, Delaware for W. A. Bradford in 1910 then sold to John H. Blodgett of Boston.

Yacht Alacrity 
It was designed by Cox and Stevens and built for  W. A. Bradford at Pusey & Jones of Wilmington, Delaware in 1910. The vessel had the United States official number 207597 with the call letters LBNR, 101 tons net, with over all  length,  waterline length,  beam,  draft and  depth.

The yacht was sold to John H. Blodgett of Boston.

World War I service 
The yacht Alacrity was acquired by the Navy on 28 April 1917 under a free lease from Mr. John H. Blodgett and was placed in commission on 30 May 1917 at Boston, Massachusetts. Designated hull number SP-206 the vessel was assigned to the 1st Naval District for the duration of World War I conducting patrols from the Boston and Provincetown, Massachusetts, section bases. Following the armistice in November 1918, the motorboat continued naval service until she was finally returned to her owner on 28 April 1919, the second anniversary of her acquisition. Her name was struck from the Navy list that same day.

Return to yachting 
After return from the Navy the yacht was sold to Kenneth B. Van Ripper of New York who refurbished the vessel's propulsion. The original six cylinder Craig engines were replaced by six cylinder Winton gasoline engines each rated at 225 horsepower. At some point the yacht was renamed Nedra B..

World War II Coast Guard service 
The yacht was acquired at a cost of $1 and converted at a cost of $2,390 into the Coast Guard's Blanchard commissioned 20 August 1942 during the U-boat blitz along the eastern seaboard then underway to augment coastal patrols. Blanchard, designated first CGR-106 and later WPYc-369, was assigned to the Gulf Sea Frontier serving out of Key West conducting anti-submarine and escort duties until decommissioned on  25 November 1943 and returned to her owners.

References

Bibliography

External links
 Photo

1910 ships
Ships built by Pusey and Jones
Individual yachts
Motorboats of the United States Navy
World War I patrol vessels of the United States
Ships of the United States Coast Guard